Duo & Trio is an album by jazz pianist Roberto Magris released on the JMood label in 2022, featuring performances by Magris on duo with saxophonist Mark Colby and on trio with his group from Kansas City. Colby performs on the odd-numbered tracks, the trio on the even-numbered.

Reception
The All About Jazz review by Jack Bowers awarded the album 4 stars and simply states: "a forceful one-two punch, initiated by Magris and Colby and completed by his sure-handed trio." The JazzWax review by Mark Myers states: "Magris's new album is truly special, particularly the way in which the two different formats were combined, leap-frogging over each other. And Magris's playing is lush and on point and his technique stellar, shifting from bop to a more introspective and moody feel.."

Track listing

  Cool World! (Roberto Magris) – 4:16
 Bellarosa (Elmo Hope) – 5:56
 Some Other Time (Leonard Bernstein) – 7:51
 Melody For “C” (Sonny Clark) – 5:50
 Papa’s Got A Brand New Rag (Roberto Magris) – 6:06
 Cherokee (Ray Noble) – 7:58
 Old Folks (Shuman) – 5:21
 Samba Rasta (Andrew Hill) – 5:58
 In The Springtime Of My Soul (Roberto Magris) – 10:10
 A Rhyme For Angela (Kurt Weill) – 7:01
 Blues For Herbie “G” (Roberto Magris) – 3:50

Personnel

Musicians
 on # 1, 3, 5, 7, 9, 11
Roberto Magris - piano
Mark Colby – tenor sax, soprano sax
 on # 2, 4, 6, 8, 10
Roberto Magris – piano
Elisa Pruett – bass
Brian Steever - drums
Pablo Sanhueza - congas on # 4 and 8, only

Production
 Paul Collins – executive producer and producer
 Vijay Tellis-Nayak – engineering (tracks # 1, 3, 5, 7, 9, 11)
 George Hunt – engineering (tracks # 2, 4, 6, 8, 10)
Abe Goldstien – design
Michael Adams – cover painting
 Jerry Lockett and Paul Collins – photography

References

2022 albums
Roberto Magris albums